3-Methyl-PCP (3'-Methyl-PCP, meta-Methyl-PCP, 3-Me-PCP) is a recreational designer drug with dissociative effects. It is an arylcyclohexylamine derivative, related to drugs such as 3'-MeO-PCP and 3'-Me-PCPy. It was first synthesised in the 1960s, but was only identified on the illicit market in Hungary in September 2020, and was made illegal in Hungary in April 2021.

See also 
 3-Cl-PCP
 3-HO-PCP
 3-F-PCP
 Deoxymethoxetamine
 MXiPr

References 

Arylcyclohexylamines
Designer drugs
Dissociative drugs
O-methylated phenols
Substances discovered in the 1960s